Social development theory attempts to explain qualitative changes in the structure and framework of society, that help the society to better realize aims and objectives. Development can be  defined in a manner applicable to all societies at all historical periods as an upward ascending movement featuring greater levels of energy, efficiency, quality, productivity, complexity, comprehension, creativity, mastery, enjoyment and accomplishment. Development is a process of social change, not merely a set of policies and programs instituted for some specific results. During the last five centuries this process has picked up in speed and intensity, and during the last five decades has witnessed a marked surge in acceleration.

The basic mechanism driving social change is increasing awareness leading to better organization. When society senses new and better opportunities for progress it develops new forms of organization to exploit these new openings successfully. The new forms of organization are better able to harness the available social energies and skills and resources to use the opportunities to get the intended results.

Development is governed by many factors that influence the results of developmental efforts. There must be a motive that drives the social change and essential preconditions for that change to occur. The motive must be powerful enough to overcome obstructions that impede that change from occurring. Development also requires resources such as capital, technology, and supporting infrastructure.

Development is the result of society's capacity to organize resources to meet challenges and opportunities. Society passes through well-defined stages in the course of its development. They are nomadic hunting and gathering, rural agrarian, urban, commercial, industrial, and post-industrial societies. Pioneers introduce new ideas, practices, and habits that conservative elements initially resist. At a later stage, innovations are accepted, imitated, organized, and used by other members of the community. Organizational improvements introduced to support the innovations can take place simultaneously at four different levels—physical, social, mental, and psychological. Moreover, four different types of resources are involved in promoting development. Of these four, physical resources are most visible, but least capable of expansion. Productivity of resources increases enormously as the quality of organization and level of knowledge inputs rise.

Development pace and scope varies according to the stage society is in. The three main stages are physical, vital (vital refers to the dynamic and nervous social energies of humanity that propel individuals to accomplish), and mental.

Terminology

Though the term development usually refers to economic progress, it can apply to political, social, and technological progress as well. These various sectors of society are so intertwined that it is difficult to neatly separate them. Development in all these sectors is governed by the same principles and laws, and therefore the term applies uniformly.

Economic development and human development need not mean the same thing. Strategies and policies aimed at greater growth may produce greater income in a country without improving the average living standard. This happened in oil-producing Middle Eastern countries—a surge in oil prices boosted their national income without much benefit to poorer citizens. Conversely, people-oriented programs and policies can improve health, education, living standards, and other quality-of-life measures with no special emphasis on monetary growth. This occurred in the 30 years of socialist and communist rule in Kerala in India.

Four related but distinct terms and phenomena form successive steps in a graded series: survival, growth, development, and evolution. Survival refers to a subsistence lifestyle with no marked qualitative changes in living standards. Growth refers to horizontal expansion in the existing plane characterized by quantitative expansion—such as a farmer increasing the area under cultivation, or a retailer opening more stores. Development refers to a vertical shift in the level of operations that causes qualitative changes, such as a retailer turning into a manufacturer or an elementary school turning into a high school.

Human development

Development is a human process, in the sense that human beings, not material factors, drive development. The energy and aspiration of people who seek development form the motive force that drives development. People's awareness may decide the direction of development. Their efficiency, productivity, creativity, and organizational capacities determine the level of people's accomplishment and enjoyment. Development is the outer realization of latent inner potentials. The level of people's education, intensity of their aspiration and energies, quality of their attitudes and values, skills and information all affect the extent and pace of development. These factors come into play whether it is the development of the individual, family, community, nation, or the whole world.

Process of emergence of new activities in society

Unconscious vs. conscious development

Human development normally proceeds from experience to comprehension. As society develops over centuries, it accumulates the experience of countless pioneers. The essence of that experience becomes the formula for accomplishment and success. The fact that experience precedes knowledge can be taken to mean that development is an unconscious process that gets carried out first, while knowledge becomes conscious later on only. Unconscious refers to activities that people carry out without knowing what the end results will be, or where their actions will lead. They carry out the acts without knowing the conditions required for success.

Role of pioneering individuals

The gathering of conscious knowledge of society matures and breaks out on the surface in the form of new ideas—espoused by pioneers who also take new initiatives to give expression to those ideas. Those initiatives may call for new strategies and new organizations, which conservative elements may resist. If the pioneer's initiatives succeed, it encourages imitation and slow propagation in the rest of the community. Later, growing success leads to society assimilating the new practice, and it becomes regularized and institutionalized. This can be viewed in three distinct phases of social preparedness, initiative of pioneers, and assimilation by the society.

The pioneer as such plays an important role in the development process—since through that person, unconscious knowledge becomes conscious. The awakening comes to the lone receptive individual first, and that person spreads the awakening to the rest of the society. Though pioneers appear as lone individuals, they act as conscious representatives of society as a whole, and their role should be viewed in that light.<ref>Cleveland, Harlan and Jacobs, Garry, The Genetic Code for Social Development". In: Human Choice, World Academy of Art & Science, USA, 1999, p. 7.</ref>

Imitation of the pioneer

Though a pioneer comes up with innovative ideas very often the initial response to a pioneer is one of indifference, ridicule or even one of outright hostility. If the pioneer persists and succeeds in an initiative, that person's efforts may eventually get the endorsement of the public. That endorsement tempts others to imitate the pioneer. If they also succeed, news spreads and brings wider acceptance. Conscious efforts to lend organizational support to the new initiative helps institutionalize the new innovation.

Organization of new activities

The organization is the human capacity to harness all available information, knowledge, resources, technology, infrastructure, and human skills to exploit new opportunities—and to face challenges and hurdles that block progress. The development comes through improvements in the human capacity of an organization. In other words, development comes through the emergence of better organizations that enhance society's capacity to make use of opportunities and face challenges.

The development of organizations may come through the formulation of new laws and regulations or new systems. Each new step of progress brings a corresponding new organization. Increasing European international trade in the 16th and 17th centuries demanded corresponding development in the banking industry and new commercial laws and civil arbitration facilities. New types of business ventures were formed to attract the capital needed to finance expanding trade. As a result, a new business entity appeared—the joint-stock company, which limited the investors' liability to the extent of their personal investment without endangering other properties.

Each new developmental advance is accompanied by new or more suitable organizations that facilitate that advance. Often, existing inadequate organizations must change to accommodate new advances.

Many countries have introduced scores of new reforms and procedures—such as the release of business activities directories, franchising, lease purchase, service, credit rating, collection agencies, industrial estates, free trade zones, and credit cards. Additionally, a diverse range of internet services have formed. Each new facility improves effective use of available social energies for productive purposes. The importance of these facilities for speeding development is apparent when they are absent. When Eastern European countries wanted to transition to market-type economies, they were seriously hampered in their efforts due to the absence of supportive systems and facilities.

Organization matures into institution

At a particular stage, organizations mature into institutions that become part of society. Beyond this point, an organization does not need laws or agencies to foster growth or ensure a continued presence. The transformation of an organization into an institution signifies society's total acceptance of that new organization.

The income tax office is an example of an organization that is actively maintained by the enactment of laws and the formation of an office for procuring taxes. Without active governmental support, this organization would disappear, as it does not enjoy universal public support. On the other hand, the institution of marriage is universally accepted, and would persist even if governments withdrew regulations that demand registration of marriage and impose age restrictions. The institution of marriage is sustained by the weight of tradition, not by government agencies and legal enactments.

Cultural transmission by the family

Families play a major role in the propagation of new activities once they win the support of the society. A family is a miniature version of the larger society—acceptance by the larger entity is reflected in the smaller entity. The family educates the younger generation and transmits social values like self-restraint, responsibility, skills, and occupational training. Though children do not follow their parents' footsteps as much as they once did, parents still mold their children's attitudes and thoughts regarding careers and future occupations. When families propagate a new activity, it signals that the new activity has become an integral part of the society.

Education

One of the most powerful means of propagating and sustaining new developments is the educational system in a society. Education transmits society's collective knowledge from one generation to the next. It equips each new generation to face future opportunities and challenges with knowledge gathered from the past. It shows the young generation the opportunities ahead for them, and thereby raises their aspiration to achieve more. Information imparted by education raises the level of expectations of youth, as well as aspirations for higher income. It also equips youth with the mental capacity to devise ways and means to improve productivity and enhance living standards.

Society can be conceived as a complex fabric that consists of interrelated activities, systems, and organizations. Development occurs when this complex fabric improves its own organization. That organizational improvement can take place simultaneously in several dimensions.
 Quantitative expansion in the volume of social activities
 Qualitative expansion in the content of all those elements that make up the social fabric
 Geographic extension of the social fabric to bring more of the population under the cover of that fabric
 Integration of existing and new organizations so the social fabric functions more efficiently

Such organizational innovations occur all the time, as a continuous process. New organizations emerge whenever a new developmental stage is reached, and old organizations are modified to suit new developmental requirements. The impact of these new organizations may be powerful enough to make people believe they are powerful in their own right—but it is society that creates the new organizations required to achieve its objectives.

The direction that the developmental process takes is influenced by the population's awareness of opportunities. Increasing awareness leads to greater aspiration, which releases greater energy that helps bring about greater accomplishment.

Resources

Since the time of the English economist Thomas Malthus, some have thought that capacity for development is limited by availability of natural resources. Resources can be divided into four major categories: physical, social, mental, and human. Land, water, minerals and oil, etc. constitute physical resources. Social resources consist of society's capacity to manage and direct complex systems and activities. Knowledge, information and technology are mental resources. The energy, skill and capacities of people constitute human resources.

The science of economics is much concerned with scarcity of resources. Though physical resources are limited, social, mental, and human resources are not subject to inherent limits. Even if these appear limited, there is no fixity about the limitation, and these resources continue to expand over time. That expansion can be accelerated by the use of appropriate strategies. In recent decades the rate of growth of these three resources has accelerated dramatically.

The role of physical resources tends to diminish as society moves to higher developmental levels. Correspondingly, the role of non-material resources increases as development advances. One of the most important non-material resources is information, which has become a key input. Information is a non-material resource that is not exhausted by distribution or sharing. Greater access to information helps increase the pace of its development. Ready access to information about economic factors helps investors transfer capital to sectors and areas where it fetches a higher return. Greater input of non-material resources helps explain the rising productivity of societies in spite of a limited physical resource base.

Application of higher non-material inputs also raises the productivity of physical inputs. Modern technology has helped increase the proven sources of oil by 50% in recent years—and at the same time, reduced the cost of search operations by 75%. Moreover, technology shows it is possible to reduce the amount of physical inputs in a wide range of activities. Scientific agricultural methods demonstrated that soil productivity could be raised through synthetic fertilizers. Dutch farm scientists have demonstrated that a minimal water consumption of 1.4 liters is enough to raise a kilogram of vegetables, compared to the thousand liters that traditional irrigation methods normally require.

Henry Ford's assembly line techniques reduced the man-hours of labor required to deliver a car from 783 minutes to 93 minutes. These examples show that the greater input of higher non-material resources can raise the productivity of physical resources and thereby extend their limits.

Technological development

When the mind engages in pure creative thinking, it comes up with new thoughts and ideas. When it applies itself to society it can come up with new organizations. When it turns to the study of nature, it discovers nature's laws and mechanisms. When it applies itself to technology, it makes new discoveries and practical inventions that boost productivity. Technical creativity has had an erratic course through history, with some intense periods of creative output followed by some dull and inactive periods. However, the period since 1700 has been marked by an intense burst of technological creativity that is multiplying human capacities exponentially.

Though many reasons can be cited for the accelerating pace of technological inventions, a major cause is the role played by mental creativity in an increasing atmosphere of freedom. Political freedom and liberation from religious dogma had a powerful impact on creative thinking during the Age of Enlightenment. Dogmas and superstitions greatly restricted mental creativity. For example, when the astronomer Copernicus proposed a heliocentric view of the world, the church rejected it because it did not conform to established religious doctrine. When Galileo used a telescope to view the planets, the church condemned the device as an instrument of the devil, as it seemed so unusual. The Enlightenment shattered such obscurantist fetters on freedom of thought. From then on, the spirit of experimentation thrived.

Though technological inventions have increased the pace of development, the tendency to view developmental accomplishments as mainly powered by technology misses the bigger picture. Technological innovation was spurred by general advances in the social organization of knowledge. In the Middle Ages, efforts at scientific progress were few, mainly because there was no effective system to preserve and disseminate knowledge. Since there was no organized protection for patent rights, scientists and inventors were secretive about observations and discoveries. Establishment of scientific associations and scientific journals spurred the exchange of knowledge and created a written record for posterity.

Technological development depends on social organizations. Nobel laureate economist Arthur Lewis observed that the mechanization of factory production in England—the Industrial Revolution—was a direct result of the reorganization of English agriculture. Enclosure of common lands in England generated surplus income for farmers. That extra income generated additional raw materials for industrial processing, and produced greater demand for industrial products that traditional manufacturing processes could not meet.

The opening of sea trade further boosted demand for industrial production for export. Factory production increased many times when production was reorganized to use steam energy, combined with moving assembly lines, specialization, and division of labor. Thus, technological development was both a result of and a contributing factor to the overall development of society.

Individual scientific inventions do not spring out of the blue. They build on past accomplishments in an incremental manner, and give a conscious form to the unconscious knowledge that society gathers over time. As pioneers are more conscious than the surrounding community, their inventions normally meet with initial resistance, which recedes over time as their inventions gain wider acceptance. If opposition is stronger than the pioneer, then the introduction of an invention gets delayed.

In medieval times, when guilds tightly controlled their members, medical progress was slow mainly because physicians were secretive about their remedies. When Denis Papin demonstrated his steam engine, German naval authorities refused to accept it, fearing it would lead to increased unemployment. John Kay, who developed a flying shuttle textile loom, was physically threatened by English weavers who feared the loss of their jobs. He fled to France where his invention was more favorably received.

The widespread use of computers and application of biotechnology raises similar resistance among the public today. Whether the public receives an invention readily or resists depends on their awareness and willingness to entertain rapid change. Regardless of the response, technological inventions occurs as part of overall social development, not as an isolated field of activity.

Limits to development

The concept of inherent limits to development arose mainly because past development was determined largely by availability of physical resources. Humanity relied more on muscle-power than thought-power to accomplish work. That is no longer the case. Today, mental resources are the primary determinant of development. Where people drove a simple bullock cart, they now design ships and aircraft that carry huge loads across immense distances. Humanity has tamed rivers, cleared jungles and even turned arid desert lands into cultivable lands through irrigation.

By using intelligence, society has turned sand into powerful silicon chips that carry huge amounts of information and form the basis of computers. Since there is no inherent limit to the expansion of society's mental resources, the notion of limits to growth cannot be ultimately binding.

Three stages of development

Society's developmental journey is marked by three stages: physical, vital, and mental. These are not clear-cut stages, but overlap. All three are present in any society at times. One of them is predominant while the other two play subordinate roles. The term 'vital' denotes the emotional and nervous energies that empower society's drive towards accomplishment and express most directly in the interactions between human beings. Before the full development of mind, it is these vital energies that predominate in human personality and gradually yield the ground as the mental element becomes stronger. The speed and circumstances of social transition from one stage to another varies.

Physical stage

The physical stage is characterized by the domination of the physical element of the human personality. During this phase, society is preoccupied with bare survival and subsistence. People follow tradition strictly and there is little innovation and change. Land is the main asset and productive resource during the physical stage and wealth is measured by the size of land holdings. This is the agrarian and feudal phase of society. Inherited wealth and position rule the roost and there is very little upward mobility. Feudal lords and military chiefs function as the leaders of the society. Commerce and money play a relatively minor role. As innovative thinking and experimental approaches are discouraged, people follow tradition unwaveringly and show little inclination to think outside of established guidelines. Occupational skills are passed down from parent to child by a long process of apprenticeship.

Guilds restrict the dissemination of trade secrets and technical knowledge. The Church controls the spread of new knowledge and tries to smother new ideas that does not agree with established dogmas. The physical stage comes to an end when the reorganization of agriculture gives scope for commerce and industry to expand. This happened in Europe during the 18th century when political revolutions abolished feudalism and the Industrial Revolution gave a boost to factory production. The shift to the vital and mental stages helps to break the bonds of tradition and inject new dynamism in social life.

Vital stage

The vital stage of society is infused with dynamism and change. The vital activities of society expand markedly. Society becomes curious, innovative and adventurous. During the vital stage emphasis shifts from interactions with the physical environment to social interactions between people. Trade supplants agriculture as the principal source of wealth.

The dawning of this phase in Europe led to exploratory voyages across the seas leading to the discovery of new lands and an expansion of sea trade. Equally important, society at this time began to more effectively harness the power of money. Commerce took over from agriculture, and money replaced land as the most productive resource. The center of life shifted from the countryside to the towns where opportunities for trade and business were in greater abundance.

The center of power shifted from the aristocracy to the business class, which employed the growing power of money to gain political influence. During the vital stage, the rule of law becomes more formal and binding, providing a secure and safe environment for business to flourish. Banks, shipping companies and joint-stock companies increase in numbers to make use of the opportunities. Fresh innovative thinking leads to new ways of life that people accept as they prove beneficial. Science and experimental approaches begin to make a headway as the hold of tradition and dogma weaken. Demand for education rises.

As the vital stage matures through the expansion of the commercial and industrial complex, surplus income arises, which prompts people to spend more on items so far considered out of reach. People begin to aspire for luxury and leisure that was not possible when life was at a subsistence level.

Mental stage

This stage has three essential characteristics: practical, social, and political application of mind. The practical application of mind generates many inventions. The social application of mind leads to new and more effective types of social organization. The political application leads to changes in the political systems that empower the populace to exercise political and human rights in a free and democratic manner. These changes began in the Renaissance and Enlightenment, and gained momentum in the Reformation, which proclaimed the right of individuals to relate directly to God without the mediation of priests. The political application of mind led to the American and French Revolutions, which produced writing that first recognized the rights of the common man and gradually led to the actual enjoyment of these rights.

Organization is a mental invention. Therefore, it is not surprising that the mental stage of development is responsible for the formulation of a great number of organizational innovations. Huge business corporations have emerged that make more money than even the total earnings of some small countries. Global networks for transportation and communication now connect the nations of the world within a common unified social fabric for sea and air travel, telecommunications, weather reporting and information exchange.

In addition to spurring technological and organizational innovation, the mental phase is also marked by the increasing  power of ideas to change social life. Ethical ideals have been with humanity since the dawn of civilization. But their practical application in daily social life had to wait for the mental stage of development to emerge. The proclamation of human rights and the recognition of the value of the individual have become effective only after the development of mind and spread of education. The 20th century truly emerged as the century of the common man. Political, social, economic and many other rights were extended to more and more sections of humanity with each succeeding decade.

The relative duration of these three stages and the speed of transition from one to another  varies from one society to another. However broadly speaking, the essential features of the physical, vital and mental stages of development are strikingly similar and therefore quite recognizable even in societies separated by great distance and having little direct contact with one another.

Moreover, societies also learn from those who have gone through these transitions before and, therefore, may be able to make the transitions faster and better. When the Netherlands introduced primary education in 1618, it was a pioneering initiative. When Japan did the same thing late in the 19th century, it had the advantage of the experience of the US and other countries. When many Asian countries initiated primary education in the 1950s after winning independence, they could draw on the vast experience of more developed nations. This is a major reason for the quickening pace of progress.

Natural vs. planned development

Natural development is distinct from development by government initiatives and planning. Natural development is the spontaneous and unconscious process of development that normally occurs. Planned development is the result of deliberate conscious initiatives by the government to speed development through special programs and policies. Natural development is an unconscious process, since it results from the behavior of countless individuals acting on their own—rather than conscious intention of the community. It is also unconscious in the sense that society achieves the results without being fully conscious of how it did so.

The natural development of democracy in Europe over the past few centuries can be contrasted with the conscious effort to introduce democratic forms of government in former colonial nations after World War II. Planned development is also largely unconscious: the goals may be conscious, but the most effective means for achieving them may remain poorly understood. Planned development can become fully conscious only when the process of development itself is fully understood. While in planned development the government is the initiator, in the natural version it is private individuals or groups that are responsible for the initiative. Whoever initiates, the principles and policies are the same and success is assured only when the conditions and right principles are followed.

See also
 Idea of Progress
 Social change
 World systems theory

References

 Jacobs, Garry et al.. Kamadhenu: The Prosperity Movement, Southern Publications, India, 1988.
 Asokan. N. History of USA'', The Mother's Service Society, 2006.

Sociological theories
Economic development
Human development
International development
Technology development